Juice Aleem is a rapper born in Birmingham, in ceremonial counties West Midlands, England.

Biography
After putting years of energy into the Birmingham hip hop scene, Juice's "Ghetto Grammer" freestyle rap sessions started featuring such other future stars as Ty, Skinnyman and MPHO. In 1996 Will Ashon started up his new Ninja Tune-backed label Big Dada and planned a roster of performers. Bandit of Birmingham's MSI/Asylum crew told Ashon about Aleem. Ashon was impressed with the music and agrees to have Aleem on board. This resulted in the first release of the now iconic record label.

In 1997 Juice featured on Big Dada's first ever release, Misanthropic, under the pseudonym "Alpha Prhyme", a collaboration between himself and Luke Vibert.

As a regular compere and host for Ninja Tune and their events, Aleem ended up working with the veterans of the label, Coldcut, and touring with them around Russia, China, New Zealand, Luxembourg, Korea, Japan,
Thailand and Ukraine.

Discography

Albums
 Jerusalaam Come, Big Dada Recordings, 2009

Singles and other releases
 "Nanotech Pilots" (12"), Big Dada Recordings, 1997
 Radio Skool: Old New & True, Big Dada Recordings, 2002 (mix CD)
 Gosh! Mix No.2 (CDr), Big Dada Recordings, 2003
 Moveup (CDs, maxi), NovaMute, 2003
 "Heel & Toe" (12", W/Lbl, promo), Marine Parade, 2005
 "Pearl Shot" (12"), Marine Parade, 2005
 First Lesson (CDs, promo), Big Dada Recordings, 2009
 Warriors, Gamma Proforma, 2016

Guest appearances
 Dynamism (CD, album) 	The Plan 	Ninja Tune 	1999
 Equilibrium (album) 	       Big Dada Recordings 1999
 Showtime (12", Promo)        Big Dada Recordings	2000
 The Plan / Dedicated (Single)    	Ninja Tune 	2000
 Xen Cuts (3xCD) 	Showtime 	Ninja Tune 	2000
 Bold (album) Lonely Boy (Hard Bossa..)F Communications 2001
 Communicate (12") 	Bound 	Big Dada Recordings 	2001
 Genetic World (CD)  Animal Man, Free, EMI Music(France) 2001
 Music First (2xCD, Comp) Lonely Boy PIAS France 	2001
 Serene Bug (CD) North Westerly Winds/Bad News Records 2001
 Extra Yard (The Bouncement Revn.) Big Dada Recordings 	2002
 French Sounds (CD) 	Lonely Boy 	Catalogue 	2002
 In The Red (album) The Living I 	Ninja Tune 	2002
 Lie Low (CD) Lie Low, Zero Gravity Big Dada Recordings 	2002
 Dance Crazy, Till A Meal Gets Rotten / Moveup  	ROMZ 	2003
 Director's Cut (album, 2XLP, CD)  Moveup, NovaMute 	2003
 Moveup (12", Single) 	        	NovaMute 	2003
 Now & Them (album) Heel 'n' Toe 	Marine Parade 	2003
 Buss (Maxi)   Moveup (MAH VIP Mix) 	NovaMute 	2004
 FabricLive. 16 (CD, mixed) Heel 'N' Toe / Fabric (London) 2004
 Futurism Ain't Shit To Me Lonely Boy (Hard Bossa / Kyo 	2004
 Master-View (album)  Distorted Minds /   Ninja Tune 	2004
 Merry KissKissMas Melon Farmers / Move Up / Aerosolik	2004
 Needs Must / Capricorn Four (7") Needs Must Surface 	2004
 The Ride (Maxi) (Luciano's Danc... 	NovaMute 	2004
 Thirst (album) (2 versions) 	Thirst 	NovaMute 	2004
 You Can Be Special Too (album) Pearl Shot/Marine Parade 2004
 DJ Face Off (CD) Thirst (Luciano's Dan..DJ Magazine 	2005
 Distorted Minds (CD, Enh) 		Ninja Tune 	2005
 Live From The Breadline /Chasin', How It Feels Big Dada 2005
 Total Kaos 05 (CD) Hell 'N' Toe 	Kaos Records 	2005
 Ultra Music Festival (CD) Heel & Toe 	Ultra Records 	2005
 Y4K (CD) Crooked-Bassbin Twins / Distinct'ive Breaks  	2005
 Bassbin Twins v.Marine Parade - Heel&Toe /Marine Parade 2006
 Universally Dirty  (2xLP)       Big Dada Recordings 	2006
 You Don't Know Ninja Cuts / DJ Food's MaskMix  / Ninja Tune 2008

References

External links
Juice Aleem official website

English people of Jamaican descent
Black British male rappers
English male rappers
Rappers from Birmingham, West Midlands
Ninja Tune artists
Year of birth missing (living people)
Living people